Acosta Municipality may refer to:
 Acosta Municipality, Falcón
 Acosta Municipality, Monagas

Municipality name disambiguation pages